Eudiaptomus is a genus of freshwater crustaceans in the family Diaptomidae. It contains the following species:

Eudiaptomus aemilianus Brian, 1927
Eudiaptomus amurensis (Rylov, 1918)
Eudiaptomus anatolicus Gündüz, 1998
Eudiaptomus angustilobus (Sars, 1898)
Eudiaptomus arnoldi (Siewerth, 1928)
Eudiaptomus atropatenus (Weisig, 1931)
Eudiaptomus bilobatus Akatova, 1949
Eudiaptomus birulai (Rylov, 1922)
Eudiaptomus chappuisi (Kiefer, 1926)
Eudiaptomus cinctus (Gurney, 1907)
Eudiaptomus drieschi (Poppe & Mrázek, 1895)
Eudiaptomus formosus (K. Kikuchi, 1928)
Eudiaptomus gracilicauda Akatova, 1949
Eudiaptomus gracilis (Sars, 1862)
Eudiaptomus graciloides (Lilljeborg, 1888)
Eudiaptomus hadzici (Brehm, 1933)
Eudiaptomus herricki Streletskaya, 1986
Eudiaptomus incongruens (Poppe, 1888)
Eudiaptomus intermedius (Steuer, 1897)
Eudiaptomus lobatus (Lilljeborg, 1889)
Eudiaptomus mariadvigae (Brehm, 1922)
Eudiaptomus pachypoditus (Rylov, 1925)
Eudiaptomus padanus (Burckhardt, 1900)
Eudiaptomus pusillus (Brady, 1913)
Eudiaptomus siewerthi (Smirnov, 1936)
Eudiaptomus vulgaris (Schmeil, 1896)
Eudiaptomus yukonensis Reed, 1991
Eudiaptomus zachariasi (Poppe, 1886)
Eudiaptomus ziegelmayeri (Kiefer, 1924)

References

Diaptomidae
Copepod genera
Taxonomy articles created by Polbot